The HP diatreme, also called the HP pipe, is a diatreme in the Rocky Mountains of southeastern British Columbia, Canada, located  northeast of Golden.

See also
 Volcanology of Canada
 List of volcanoes in Canada

References

Diatremes of British Columbia